"Suspicion" is the fourth and final single released from American rock band R.E.M.'s from their 11th studio album, Up (1998). Unlike previous singles from Up, "Suspicion" was the only single from the album not to chart.

A live version of the song, recorded at Toast Studios in San Francisco, 1998, was released as a B-side to the second single from Up, "Lotus", released the following year and peaked at number 26 on the UK Singles Chart. This version was included in the German releases of the CD.

Track listings
UK CD single 1
 "Suspicion" (Album Version)
 "Electrolite" (Live)
 "Man on the Moon" (Live)
 Tracks two and three were recorded live on Later with Jools Holland

UK 3-inch CD single
 "Suspicion" (Live from Ealing Studios)
 "Perfect Circle" (Live)
 Track two was recorded live on Later with Jools Holland

References

R.E.M. songs
1998 songs
1999 singles
Song recordings produced by Michael Stipe
Song recordings produced by Mike Mills
Song recordings produced by Pat McCarthy (record producer)
Song recordings produced by Peter Buck
Songs written by Michael Stipe
Songs written by Mike Mills
Songs written by Peter Buck
Warner Records singles